Tekamah (pronounced "teh-KAY-muh") is a city in Burt County, Nebraska, United States. The population was 1,736 at the 2010 census. It is the county seat of Burt County.

History
Tekamah was founded in October 1854 by Benjamin R. Folsom, and incorporated on March 14, 1855. The name is derived from the Omaha language, meaning "big cottonwood". Its development was stimulated by construction of railroads through the area, such as the Chicago & North Western, which have since been taken out of Tekamah.

The town has seen a resurgence in recent years with the appearance of small businesses such as Chatterbox Brews, Second Chance Boutique, The Tipsy Pig, and Gotta Get Some Coffee.

Geography

Climate
This climatic region is typified by large seasonal temperature differences, with warm to hot (and often humid) summers and cold (sometimes severely cold) winters.  According to the Köppen Climate Classification system, Tekamah has a humid continental climate, abbreviated "Dfa" on climate maps.

Demographics

2010 census
As of the census of 2010, there were 1,736 people, 715 households, and 478 families living in the city. The racial makeup of the city was 96.8% White, 0.5% African American, 1.1% Native American, 0.2% Asian, and 1.5% from two or more races. Hispanic or Latino of any race were 1.8% of the population.

There were 715 households, of which 27.4% had children under the age of 18 living with them, 54.4% were married couples living together, 7.1% had a female householder with no husband present, 5.3% had a male householder with no wife present, and 33.1% were non-families. 29.2% of all households were made up of individuals, and 16.8% had someone living alone who was 65 years of age or older. The average household size was 2.37 and the average family size was 2.93.

The median age in the city was 44.1 years. 24.5% of residents were under the age of 18; 5.8% were between the ages of 18 and 24; 20.9% were from 25 to 44; 25.8% were from 45 to 64; and 22.9% were 65 years of age or older. The gender makeup of the city was 47.2% male and 52.8% female.

2000 census
As of the census of 2000, there were 1,892 people, 778 households, and 522 families living in the city. The population density was 1,492.2 people per square mile (575.2/km). There were 833 housing units at an average density of 657.0 per square mile (253.2/km). The racial makeup of the city was 99.05% White, 0.11% African American, 0.48% Native American, 0.05% Asian, and 0.32% from two or more races. Hispanic or Latino of any race were 0.79% of the population.

There were 778 households, out of which 31.1% had children under the age of 18 living with them, 56.0% were married couples living together, 7.5% had a female householder with no husband present, and 32.9% were non-families. 30.1% of all households were made up of individuals, and 18.0% had someone living alone who was 65 years of age or older. The average household size was 2.38 and the average family size was 2.94.

In the city, the population was spread out, with 25.3% under the age of 18, 6.9% from 18 to 24, 23.6% from 25 to 44, 22.2% from 45 to 64, and 22.0% who were 65 years of age or older. The median age was 42 years. For every 100 females, there were 88.6 males. For every 100 females age 18 and over, there were 86.4 males.

As of 2000 the median income for a household in the city was $35,708, and the median income for a family was $41,688. Males had a median income of $30,650 versus $21,125 for females. The per capita income for the city was $16,836. About 5.7% of families and 7.8% of the population were below the poverty line, including 10.8% of those under age 18 and 10.0% of those age 65 or over.

Notable people
 Curt Bromm, former Speaker of the Nebraska Legislature
 Hoot Gibson, rodeo champion and early cowboy film actor, director, and producer
 Robert C. Holland, economist, Federal Reserve Board Governor
 Don Stenberg, State Treasurer of Nebraska and former State Attorney General

References

External links
 City of Tekamah
 Tekamah Chamber of Commerce

Cities in Burt County, Nebraska
Cities in Nebraska
County seats in Nebraska
1854 establishments in Nebraska Territory